Kot Hussain is a village located in the Nankana Sahib District of Punjab province in Pakistan.

Populated places in Nankana Sahib District